Diego Osorio  (born 21 July 1970) is a former Colombian footballer.

Club career
Osorio began his professional career in Independiente Medellín, before moving to Atlético Nacional where he would spend most of his playing career.

International career
Osorio made 17 appearances for the senior Colombia national football team from 1991 to 1995. He also played at the 1992 Summer Olympics.

Osorio also played for Colombia at the 1989 FIFA U-16 World Championship.

Arrest
Osorio was arrested for cocaine possession and trafficking in Miami, Florida in August 2002.
Osorio was arrested for cocaine possession and trafficking in Bogota, Colombia in October 2016.

References

External links

1970 births
Living people
Colombian footballers
Footballers from Medellín
Colombia international footballers
1991 Copa América players
1993 Copa América players
Footballers at the 1992 Summer Olympics
Olympic footballers of Colombia
Colombia under-20 international footballers
Categoría Primera A players
Atlético Nacional footballers
Independiente Medellín footballers
Independiente Santa Fe footballers
Colombian drug traffickers
Association football defenders